William Stillman may refer to:

 William James Stillman (1828–1901), American journalist, diplomat, author, historian, and photographer
 William O. Stillman (1856–1924), American physician, animal welfare activist, humanitarian and medical writer